Margarita Marlene González Fernández is a Cuban politician and is the Cuban Minister of Labor and Social Security (2009–present). She was appointed as a result of the 2009 shake-up by Raúl Castro.

Early life 
Ms. González has a Master's Degree in Human Resources and is an Industrial Engineer. In 2001, she was made Vice Minister of Labor and Social Security and in 2003, she was appointed to First Vice Minister. She is a member of the Communist Party of Cuba.

References
 The Miami Herald, Cuban Economy: Purge Aims to Halt Cuba's Economic Free Fall, Sunday March 8, 2009, Page 1A.

External links
https://web.archive.org/web/20090306080555/http://www.granma.cubaweb.cu/pdf/martes/pagina5.pdf
https://web.archive.org/web/20071011123545/http://wtopnews.com/?nid=105

 

Government ministers of Cuba
Year of birth missing (living people)
Living people
Communist Party of Cuba politicians
Women government ministers of Cuba
21st-century Cuban women politicians
21st-century Cuban politicians